Peter J. Tropman  (born December 5, 1944), is a former member of the Wisconsin State Assembly.

He in Buffalo, New York. He graduated from Avonworth High School in Pittsburgh, Pennsylvania, as well as Buffalo State College and the University of Wisconsin–Milwaukee.

Career
Tropman was elected to the Assembly in 1972. He is a Democrat.

References

Politicians from Buffalo, New York
Politicians from Pittsburgh
Buffalo State College alumni
University of Wisconsin–Milwaukee alumni
1944 births
Living people
Democratic Party members of the Wisconsin State Assembly